Ensi Nkore is the official anthem of the Nkore Kingdom. Translated as "Our Land Nkore", the song is being sung whenever the Kingdom functions are about to begin. 

However, the Kingdom is not yet officially restored. Various Kingdom activists and royalties sing this song before the official ceremonies. Notable among them is the Nkore Activist Group which has an established office on Kamukuzi hill, at Mugaba House Mbarara, Uganda.

Anthem Lyrics
The song lyrics praise the beauty of the land of Nkore, the hills, valleys and plains as it describes the land as Kaaro Karungi.

Lyrics

Verse I
Twena twananuka ahabw’egyo migisha 

Nyamuhanga ei y’aturondeire

Okutwara ensi yaitu egi Kaaro omumaisho

Kandi n’okugyebemberagye
Chorus
Ensi  Nkore, Ensi  Nkore,

Ensi  Nkore, etushemeza

Katweyongyere kweshongora  Ensi Nkore.

Ensi Nkore, ensi Nkore, etushemeza
Verse II
Titurikwebwa agomamanzi agakare

Agayombekire ensi yaitu

Gakagitunguura ekagyenda omumaisho

Kandi nabagijwereire eshagama.
Verse III
Twena twesimire ebirungi bya Kaaro

Enshozi, empita; n'emigyera

'Matungo ebihingwa n'abantu abarungi

Kandi na Rubambansi Omugabe

References

Anthems